Anthony Midget (born February 22, 1978) is an American football coach. He played college football at Virginia Tech. After a short-lived career playing professionally in the National Football League (NFL), Midget began coaching beginning at the high school level and then progressing from college to the NFL.

Playing career
Midget played high school football in Clewiston, Florida at Clewiston High School. From there, he proceeded to Virginia Tech, where he was a four-year letter winner and three-year starter. After his senior season, Midget was named a third-team All-American, first-team All-Big East, and a member of the Big East All-Academic Team. A Dean's List student, Midget graduated with a degree in sociology in 1999. He was drafted in the fifth round of the 2000 NFL Draft by the Atlanta Falcons.  He also spent two seasons on the practice squad of the Tampa Bay Buccaneers.

Coaching career
After his short-lived playing career, Midget began his coaching career in 2002 at Lake Worth High School in Florida where he held many positions culminating with being the assistant head coach and defensive coordinator. In 2007, he went back to his alma mater at Virginia Tech as a graduate assistant. From Virginia Tech, Midget progressed to Georgia State where, from 2008 to 2011, he served as the special teams coordinator and defensive backs coach and in 2012 he served as the defensive coordinator and defensive backs coach. He was briefly hired in January 2013 to serve as a defensive assistant at Marshall, but before he coached a game at Marshall he was hired at Penn State to coach safeties.

In 2014, the Houston Texans hired Midget as their Assistant Secondary Coach, and in 2018, he was promoted to Secondary Coach. On January 28, 2020, it was announced that Midget was hired as the secondary coach for the Tennessee Titans.

On January 9, 2023, the Titans head coach Mike Vrabel announced Midget had been fired.

References

Living people
1978 births
African-American coaches of American football
African-American players of American football
American football cornerbacks
Atlanta Falcons players
Georgia State Panthers football coaches
Houston Texans coaches
Marshall Thundering Herd football coaches
Penn State Nittany Lions football coaches
People from Clewiston, Florida
Players of American football from Florida
Tampa Bay Buccaneers players
Tennessee Titans coaches
Virginia Tech Hokies football coaches
Virginia Tech Hokies football players
21st-century African-American sportspeople
20th-century African-American sportspeople